Totalai is an administrative unit, known as Union council of Buner District in the Khyber Pakhtunkhwa province of Pakistan. It is the town of district Buner as on the basis of population and development.

KhuduKhel or Khudu Khel is a tehsil and Totalai is the Capital of Tehsil Khudu Khel. Totalai is located near district Swabi in the northwestern region of the country. Totalai has a police station named Saheed Noor Wali Khan Police Station (which is named after a brave soldier, Noor Wali Khan, was martyred by Taliban in 2008), hospital (THQ), private hospital named (Gohar Hospital & Trust Totalai Khudukhel), degree college for men, degree college for girls and many primary, middle, high, and secondary schools for boys and girls, Office of the Magistrate. Totalai is an administrative unit of Tehsil Khudu Khel, known as Union council of Buner District in the Khyber Pakhtunkhwa province of Pakistan.

Totalai is the Capital of Tehsil Khudu Khel and also one of the most important towns  of district Buner. This is the gateway to Swat District and Buner previously known as princely state, the Yusafzai State of Swat via Swabi. Totalai is the advanced town of District Buner.

District Buner has 6 Tehsils; Daggar Chagharzai Chamla Khudu Khel Gagra and Gadezai. Each Tehsil comprises members of the Union councils. There are 5 union councils in KhuduKhel and 27 union councils in whole district Buner.

People of Town Totalai

History 
District Buner has 6 Tehsils i.e. Daggar Chagharzai Chamla Khudu Khel Gagra Gadezai.. Each tehsil comprises certain numbers of union councils. There are 27 union councils in district Buner.

See also 

 Dagai
 Buner District

References

External links
United Nations
Hajjinfo.org Uploads
PBS paiman.jsi.com

Buner District
Populated places in Buner District
Union councils of Khyber Pakhtunkhwa
Union Councils of Buner District